John Letcher Bryan (December 27, 1848 – December 23, 1898) was an American politician. He was the eighth Mayor of Orlando, Florida, from 1883 to 1885, when he resigned. He also served in the Confederate Army during the American Civil War. He is buried in Greenwood Cemetery in Orlando.

References

Mayors of Orlando, Florida
1848 births
1898 deaths
19th-century American politicians